
Gmina Cedynia is an urban-rural gmina (administrative district) in Gryfino County, West Pomeranian Voivodeship, in north-western Poland, on the German border.

The gmina contains part of the protected area called Cedynia Landscape Park.

Villages
Apart from the town of Cedynia, Gmina Cedynia contains the villages and settlements of Barcie, Bielinek, Czachów, Golice, Lubiechów Dolny, Lubiechów Górny, Łukowice, Markocin, Niesułów, Orzechów, Osinów Dolny, Parchnica, Piasecznik, Piasek, Radostów, Siekierki, Stara Rudnica, Stary Kostrzynek, Trzypole and Żelichów.

Neighbouring gminas
Gmina Cedynia is bordered by the gminas of Chojna, Mieszkowice and Moryń. It also borders Germany.

References
Polish official population figures 2006

Cedynia
Gryfino County